FOOF may refer to:
 Flags of Our Fathers, a book about the Battle of Iwo Jima
 Flags of Our Fathers (film), a film based on the book
 Independent Order of Odd Fellows (Fraternal Order of Odd Fellows)
 f00f, the term for an exploit common to early Intel microprocessors
 Foof (artist), former drummer with The Bloodhound Gang
 Dioxygen difluoride, a chemical compound with the formula FOOF